Cherykaw is a town in Mogilev Region, Belarus. It is located in the east of the region, on the Sozh River, and serves as the administrative center of Cherykaw District. As of 2009, its population was 8,177.

History
Cherykaw was first mentioned in 1460. At the time, it was a part of Kingdom of Poland, and Casimir IV Jagiellon, the king, ordered to have an Orthodox church to be built in Cherykaw. In 1604, Cherykaw was granted the town status, and in 1641, it was granted a coat of arms. In 1772, as a result of the First Partition of Poland, it was transferred to Russia. In the 19th century it belonged to Mogilev Governorate. In 1919, Mogilev Governorate was abolished, and Cherykaw was transferred to Gomel Governorate. On July 17, 1924 the governorate was abolished, and Cherykaw became the administrative center of Cherykaw Raion, which belonged to Kalinin Okrug of Byelorussian Soviet Socialist Republic. In July, 1927, Kalinin Okrug was abolished, and Cherykaw was transferred into Mogilev Okrug. On January 15, 1938 the raion was transferred to Mogilev Region. During the Second World War, the town was occupied by German troops and severely damaged. In 1986, it was considerably affected by the Chernobyl disaster.

Economy

Industry
There are timber industry and textile industry enterprises in Cherykaw.

Transportation
The town is located on the highway connecting Roslavl in Russia with Bobruysk. There are also road connections with Mogilev via Chavusy and with Kastsyukovichy.

Culture and recreation
In Cherykaw, several buildings survived from the 19th and the beginning of the 20th century. In particular, the Catholic church was built in 1869, and in the Soviet times was used as a Palace of Culture. One of the mansions from the 19th century is currently used as a church.

References

External links
 The murder of the Jews of Cherykaw during World War II, at Yad Vashem website.

Towns in Belarus
Populated places in Mogilev Region
Cherykaw District
Cherikovsky Uyezd
Holocaust locations in Belarus